The 2016–17 New Zealand Football Championship season (currently known as the Stirling Sports Premiership for sponsorship reasons) was the thirteenth season of the NZFC since its establishment in 2004. Ten teams competed this season with the addition of Eastern Suburbs AFC and Tasman United, and with WaiBOP United replaced by Hamilton Wanderers.

The competition began on 16 October and ended on 2 April 2017.

Clubs

Regular season

League table

Positions by round

Fixtures and results

Round 8 (rescheduled)

Round 1

Round 2

Round 3

Round 4

Round 5

Round 6

Round 7

Round 8

Round 9

Round 10

Round 11

Round 12

Round 13

Round 14

Round 15

Round 7 (rescheduled)

Round 16

Round 13 (rescheduled)

Round 17

Round 18 (rescheduled)

Round 17 (rescheduled)

Round 18

Finals series

Semi-finals

Grand final

Statistics

Top scorers

References

External links
 ASB Premiership website

New Zealand Football Championship seasons
1
New Zealand Football Championship
New Zealand Football Championship